Ayub bin Rahmat is a Malaysian politician. He was a member of Johor State Legislative Assembly for Kemelah from 2004 to 2018. He is a member of the United Malays National Organisation (UMNO), a component party of Barisan Nasional (BN) coalition.

Election Results

Honours
  :
  Medal of the Order of the Defender of the Realm (PPN) (2007)
  Member of the Order of the Defender of the Realm (AMN) (2008)
  :
  Companion Class II of the Exalted Order of Malacca (DPSM) - Datuk (2010)

References 

Living people
People from Johor
Malaysian people of Malay descent
Malaysian Muslims
United Malays National Organisation politicians
21st-century Malaysian politicians
Year of birth missing (living people)
Members of the Johor State Legislative Assembly
Johor state executive councillors
Members of the Order of the Defender of the Realm
Medallists of the Order of the Defender of the Realm